Gaetano Previati (1852 – 1920) was an Italian Symbolist painter in the Divisionist style.

Biography
Previati was born in Ferrara. He relocated to Milan in 1876 and enrolled at the Brera Academy of Fine Arts, studying under Giuseppe Bertini, Giovanni Morelli, and Federico Faruffini. While he focused on historic and religious canvases, albeit with a bent for mysticism and passionate topics. He became strongly attached to the Divisionist style, and even published a treatise on I principi scientifici del Divisionismo (1909).

Biography
In 1879, he won the Canonica prize with his composition of Gli ostaggi di Crema. The next year at Turin, he exhibited a large canvas of Cesare Borgia at Capua. Having settled in Milan definitively in 1881, he came into contact with the Scapigliatura movement. In 1881 at Milan, he displayed the genre painting Preferenza as well as Christ Crucified (1880); Abelard;  and At the entrance of the Harem. In 1883, he exhibited Un angolo del solaio, May, and Saleswoman. At the 1883 Mostra of Rome he exhibited Angels and A November at Ferrara. In 1884 at the Mostra of Turin, he displayed the following oil paintings: Oporto; May: First Communion; and Crepuscoli; and four watercolors: Aurora; Herb Market; Suonatori; Storia di un nudo: Studio.

in 1886–87, at Milan and Turin, he exhibited the patriotic historical painting titled Tiremm innanz (Fire away). Lorenzo Benapiani wrote about Fire Away in his book titled Ars. The canvas depicts the execution of the patriot Antonio Sciesa who had been active in the rebellion in Milan against Austrian rule. The political overtones of his works causes controversy with the government; for example, an award given to his Cleopatra was withdrawn by the Academic Council of Milan.

At Venice, in 1887, he exhibited L'Haschich and at the 1888 National Exhibition of Fine Arts of Bologna: Christ and the Magdalen; Oporto and Le fumatrici di haschisch.

He took part in the 1st Brera Triennale in 1891 with a work clearly showing his adoption of Divisionism, of which he was also a theoretician, and Symbolist themes. He took part in the Venice Biennale by invitation from 1895 to 1914, including solo shows of his work in 1901 and 1912. He was involved in the creation of the Dream Room at the 7th Biennale in 1907 and exhibited at the Salon des Peintres Divisionnistes Italiens organised in Paris by the art dealer Alberto Grubicy. It was Alberto and his brother Vittore who founded the Società per l’Arte di Gaetano Previati'' in 1911, purchasing a large number of his paintings and showing them in exhibitions in Genoa (1915) and Milan (1916 and 1919). Grief-stricken over the death of members of his family, he died in 1920 at the town of Lavagna in Liguria, where he was in the habit of staying for long periods.

Gallery

References
 Laura Casone, Gaetano Previati, online catalogue Artgate by Fondazione Cariplo, 2010, CC BY-SA (source for the first revision of this article).

Other projects

19th-century Italian painters
Italian male painters
20th-century Italian painters
Painters from Milan
Scapigliatura Movement
1852 births
1920 deaths
Symbolist painters
Divisionist painters
Painters from Ferrara
Brera Academy alumni
Orientalist painters
19th-century Italian male artists
20th-century Italian male artists